Meghara McManus (born April 12, 1998) is an American ice hockey player who currently plays for the Boston Pride in the Premier Hockey Federation.

Career 
In 140 NCAA games at the University of New Hampshire, McManus scored 84 points. As a senior she was awarded the team MVP of the UNH Wildcats while leading the team in goals (17) and points (27).

McManus was drafted in the 5th round of the 2020 NWHL Draft and signed a one-year deal with the Boston Pride on June 23, 2020. In her first two seasons with the Pride, the team won back-to-back Isobel Cup championships.

Personal life 
McManus majored in psychology at the University of New Hampshire.

Career stats

Source

Honours 
2019-20 Karyn L. Bye Award (MVP) for the UNH Wildcats team
2019-20 Blue Line Club Award (awarded for exhibiting a positive culture in the locker room, on the ice, in youth clinics and in the community)
2017-18 Led the UNH Wildcats in goals (11) and points (20) (tied in both categories)
Source

References

External links
 
 

1998 births
Living people
American women's ice hockey forwards
Boston Pride players
New Hampshire Wildcats women's ice hockey players
Ice hockey players from Massachusetts
Premier Hockey Federation players
People from Milton, Massachusetts